The Forgery of Foreign Bills Act 1803 (43 Geo 3 c 139) was an Act of the Parliament of the United Kingdom. Prior to its repeal in 2013, it created offences of forgery of foreign instruments in Scotland.

Preamble
The preamble read:

Section 1
In Scotland, this section read:

Repeals
This section was repealed for England and Wales by section 31 of the Forgery Act 1830, and for Ireland by section 1 of, and the Schedule to, the 24 & 25 Vict c 95.

Sentence
A person guilty of an offence under this section was liable to imprisonment for a term not exceeding fourteen years.

Section 2
In Scotland, this section provided:

Repeals
The words omitted were repealed for Scotland by section 2 of the Criminal Justice Act 1948.

This section was repealed for England and Wales by section 31 of the Forgery Act 1830, and for Ireland by section 1 of, and the Schedule to, the 24 & 25 Vict c 95.

Sentence
A person guilty of a second offence under this section was liable to imprisonment for a term not exceeding fourteen years.

Sections 3 to 8
These sections are repealed by section 1 of, and the Schedule to, the 24 & 25 Vict c 95.

Repeal
This Act was repealed for the Republic of Ireland by sections 2 and 3 of, and Part 4 of Schedule 2 to, the Statute Law Revision Act 2007. The Draft Statute Law (Repeals) Bill 2012, contained in the nineteenth report on statute law revision of the Law Commission and the Scottish Law Commission, proposed repealing the Act for Scotland. The whole Act was repealed in Scotland by section 1 of, and Group 4 of Part 2 of Schedule 1 to, the Statute Law (Repeals) Act 2013.

See also
Forgery Act
Scottish criminal law

References
Danby Pickering. The Statutes at Large, 1803.

External links
The Forgery of Foreign Bills Act 1803, as amended from the National Archives.
List of repeals and amendments in the Republic of Ireland from the Irish Statute Book.

United Kingdom Acts of Parliament 1803
Acts of the Parliament of the United Kingdom concerning Scotland
Forgery
1803 in Scotland